The 2018–19 LEN Champions League was the 56th edition of LEN's premier competition for men's water polo clubs.

Overview

Team allocation
12 teams are directly qualified for the preliminary round (TH: Champions League title holders).

Phases and rounds dates
The schedule of the competition is as follows.

Qualifying rounds

Qualification round I

Group A

Group B

Qualification round II

Group C

Group D

Group E

Group F

Qualification round III

|}

Preliminary round

The draw for the group stage was held on 5 September 2018 in Barcelona. The 16 teams were drawn into two groups of eight.

In each group, teams play against each other home-and-away in a round-robin format. The group winners, runners-ups and third placed teams advance to the Final 8. They are joined by the host of the tournament and the fourth placed team from a group other than one the host plays in. The matchdays are 17 October, 3 and 21 November, 5 and 19 December 2018, 9 and 23 January, 6 and 27 February, 16 and 27 March, 13 and 24 April, 15 May 2019.

A total of 9 national associations are represented in the group stage.

Group A

Group B

Final eight
6–8 June 2018—Hannover, Germany

Qualified teams

Bracket

5th–8th place bracket

Quarterfinals

5th–8th place semifinals

Semifinals

Seventh place game

Fifth place game

Third place game

Final

Final standings

Awards

See also
2018–19 LEN Euro Cup

References

External links

LEN Champions League seasons
Champions League
2018 in water polo
2019 in water polo